The Roanoke Dazzle were an NBA Development League team based in Roanoke, Virginia, U.S.. In operation from the inaugural D-League season of 2001–02 through the 2005–06 season, the Dazzle marked the return of professional basketball to Roanoke since the Virginia Squires called Roanoke home in the 1970s. Playing their home games at the Roanoke Civic Center, their logo design featured a star moving on rail tracks around a basketball.

Franchise history
The NBDL initially announced that Roanoke was under consideration for one of the inaugural teams in August 2000. Competing with Hampton for Virginia's NBDL team, Roanoke was evaluated as a potential franchise location based on its population, arena size and lack of a major NCAA basketball program in the Roanoke Valley. After reaching an agreement to play home games at the Roanoke Civic Center, the NBDL announced Roanoke as the league's fifth member on May 18, 2001. The announcement marked the return of professional basketball to Roanoke since the departure of the American Basketball Association's Virginia Squires following the 1972–73 season.

By June 2001, Donna Daniels was named team president and Kent Davison was announced as the first head coach in franchise history. On July 18, 2001, Daniels announced the team nickname, the Dazzle. The name was chosen purposefully to not reflect Roanoke's railroad heritage as two other professional teams, the Roanoke Express and the Roanoke Steam, already called the civic center home. The Dazzle would be victorious in the inaugural game on November 18, 2001, against the Mobile Revelers in the Roanoke Civic Center.

After five seasons, and overall moderate success on the court, the Dazzle were one of the final two teams from the NBDL inaugural season to last through the 2005–06 season. The Fayetteville Patriots were the other. Both were owned by the NBA for their entire five season history. On May 1, 2006, the NBA Development League announced that the NBA would no longer operate the Roanoke Dazzle. League President Phil Evans briefly held out the possibility of a local ownership group operating the team. However, when a local ownership group failed to materialize, the team was disbanded.

Season by season results

Players of note 
 Cory Alexander–San Antonio Spurs
 Andray Blatche–Washington Wizards
 Will Bynum–Detroit Pistons
 Matt Carroll–Charlotte Bobcats
 Anthony Grundy–Atlanta Hawks
 Mikki Moore–Sacramento Kings
 Gabe Muoneke–Saba Battery Tehran BC of the Iranian Basketball Super League
 Peter John Ramos–Washington Wizards
 Andreas Glyniadakis–Maroussi BC of the Greek A1 League
 Curtis Staples–Chicago Bulls
 Jason Clark–Virginia Cavaliers

NBA affiliates
New Jersey Nets (2005–2006)
Philadelphia 76ers (2005–2006)
Washington Wizards (2005–2006)

See also
Richmond Rhythm

Notes

 
Basketball teams established in 2001
Basketball teams disestablished in 2006
Basketball teams in Virginia